Siham Benchekroun  is a Moroccan novelist and poet. She is a physician, psychotherapist, researcher and community activist for women in vulnerable situations. She is also a writer who has published short stories and social novels. Her writing and speeches focus on the status of women in Morocco.

«The best ideas can remain at the indeterminate stage of projects if they are not supported, especially at a material level. The project on inheritance in Morocco, led and published by Empreintes Editions in the form of 3 books: French (The Legacy of Women), English (Women Inheritance) and Arabic (Mirath An-Nissae), must therefore a lot, not only to the team of authors and translators who have committed themselves to it, but also to the sponsors who are involved in the financing. Among them, the AJIAL Foundation was our main partner. We thank the steering committee for believing in us and for accompanying us in this triple edition.»

Bibliography
Oser vivre, roman, Casablanca: Eddif, 1999, 272 pages. Published in Arabic, Editions Empreintes, 2002, translation by Abdelhadi Idrissi, 288 pages.
A toi, poems (bilingual), Casablanca: Editions Empeintes, 2000, 88 pages.
Les Jours d’ici, short stories, Casablanca: Editions Empreintes, 2003.

References

Samira Douider, Le roman maghrébin et subsaharien de langue française: études comparées, L'Harmattan, 2007, p. 20-37
Susanne Heiler, Der maghrebinische Roman, ed. Narr Dr. Gunter, 2005, p. 185

20th-century Moroccan poets
Moroccan women writers
Moroccan writers in French
People from Fez, Morocco
Year of birth missing (living people)
Living people
Moroccan women poets
21st-century Moroccan poets